Luciano Paccagnella (18 May 1939) is a former Italian decathlete who competed at the 1960 Summer Olympics,

References

External links 
 

1939 births
Living people
Athletes (track and field) at the 1960 Summer Olympics
Italian decathletes
Olympic athletes of Italy